Guillaume Quesque (born 29 April 1989) is a French volleyball player, a member of France men's national volleyball team and Turkish club Fenerbahçe Istanbul, a gold medalist of the 2017 World League, French Champion (2010).

Career

Clubs
His professional career began in Tours VB in 2008. On December 4, 2014 he terminated the contract with the Italian club and became a free player. On December 19, 2014 he signed a contract with Polish club Jastrzębski Węgiel.

Sporting achievements

Clubs

National championships
 2008/2009  French Cup, with Tours VB
 2009/2010  French Cup, with Tours VB
 2009/2010  French Championship, with Tours VB
 2016/2017  Turkish Cup, with Fenerbahçe

National team
 2007  CEV U19 European Championship
 2007  FIVB U19 World Championship
 2008  CEV U21 European Championship
 2017  FIVB World League

Individually
 2007 CEV U19 European Championship - Most Valuable Player

References

External links
 Guillaume Quesque at the International Volleyball Federation
 
 LegaVolley Serie A player profile
 PlusLiga player profile
 

1989 births
Living people
Volleyball players from Paris
French men's volleyball players
French expatriate sportspeople in Italy
French expatriate sportspeople in Poland
Expatriate volleyball players in Poland
French expatriate sportspeople in Russia
Expatriate volleyball players in Russia
Jastrzębski Węgiel players
Volleyball players at the 2015 European Games
European Games competitors for France